1 Samuel 24 is the twenty-fourth chapter of the First Book of Samuel in the Old Testament of the Christian Bible or the first part of the Books of Samuel in the Hebrew Bible. According to Jewish tradition the book was attributed to the prophet Samuel, with additions by the prophets Gad and Nathan, but modern scholars view it as a composition of a number of independent texts of various ages from c. 630–540 BCE. This chapter contains the account of David's escape from Saul's repeated attempts to kill him. This is within a section comprising 1 Samuel 16 to 2 Samuel 5 which records the rise of David as the king of Israel.

Text
This chapter was originally written in the Hebrew language. It is divided into 22 verses.

Textual witnesses
Some early manuscripts containing the text of this chapter in Hebrew are of the Masoretic Text tradition, which includes the Codex Cairensis (895), Aleppo Codex (10th century), and Codex Leningradensis (1008). Fragments containing parts of this chapter in Hebrew were found among the Dead Sea Scrolls including 4Q51 (4QSam; 100–50 BCE) with extant verses 3–5, 8–10, 14–23.

Extant ancient manuscripts of a translation into Koine Greek known as the Septuagint (originally was made in the last few centuries BCE) include Codex Vaticanus (B; B; 4th century) and Codex Alexandrinus (A; A; 5th century).

Places 

Engedi

David spared Saul (24:1–15)
1 Samuel 23:29 (24:1 in the Hebrew Bible) reports David's move to Engedi in the hilly area around the Dead Sea, while Saul, returning from a battle with the Philistines, was pursuing. The section emphasizes two points: (1) David could have easily kiled Saul and thereby seized the kingship, but (2) he resisted the temptation to kill 'the LORD'S anointed', even prevented his men from harming Saul (verse 7). David elaborated in his speech (verses 8–15) that instead of taking vengeance on Saul (for 'treating him like an insignificant dog or flea'), he duly acknowledged Saul's position as a God-chosen king (verse 8) while entrusted vengeance to God (verse 12). Another similar account of sparing Saul's life is found in 26:1–25.

Verse 3
And he came to the sheepcotes by the way, where was a cave; and Saul went in to cover his feet: and David and his men remained in the sides of the cave.
"Sheepcotes": or ""sheepfolds" are 'simple walled enclosures' (Numbers 32:16; Judges 5:16; 2 Chronicles 32:28; Psalms 78:70; Zechariah 2:6; John 10:1) into where the sheep are driven at night to protect them from robbers or wild beasts, could be in the form of caves in winter time (1 cf. Zechariah 2:6).
"Cover his feet": an idiom (euphemism) for 'relieving oneself'.

David’s oath to Saul (24:16–22)
This section contrasts David's uprightness in submitting to the will of God and not taking matters into his own hands against Saul's pitiful figure. All three parts of Saul's speech reflects his weak position: (1) Saul conceded that his actions had been evil and that David was more 'righteous' than he (verse 17); (2) Saul acknowledged that David would become king (cf. Jonathan's words to David at Horesh in 1 Samuel 23:17); (3) Saul pled that David would preserve his name and not cut off his descendants (echoing Jonathan's pact with David concerning the house of Saul in 1 Samuel 20:14–15).

Verse 22
And David swore this to Saul. Then Saul went home, but David and his men went up to the stronghold.
Commonly a new king (of a new dynasty) killed all the descendants of the king he replaced to get rid of potential rivals, but David swore an oath not to wipe out Saul's dynasty, which he fulfilled by his treatment of Mephibosheth, son of Jonathan (2 Samuel 9). When Saul went home, David wisely knew Saul's double dealing ways not to follow Saul, but to remain as a fugitive in the wilderness.

See also

Related Bible parts: 1 Samuel 20, 1 Samuel 21, 1 Samuel 22, 1 Samuel 23

Notes

References

Sources

Commentaries on Samuel

General

External links
 Jewish translations:
 Shmuel I - I Samuel - Chapter 24 (Judaica Press). Hebrew text and English translation [with Rashi's commentary] at Chabad.org
 Christian translations:
 Online Bible at GospelHall.org (ESV, KJV, Darby, American Standard Version, Bible in Basic English)
 1 Samuel chapter 24. Bible Gateway

24